The siege of Tyre took place from 12 November 1187 to 1 January 1188. An army commanded by Saladin made an amphibious assault on the city, defended by Conrad of Montferrat. After two months of continuous struggle, Saladin dismissed his army and retreated to Acre.

Background
After the disastrous Battle of Hattin, much of the Holy Land had been lost to Saladin, including Jerusalem. The remnants of the crusader army flocked to Tyre, which was one of the major cities still in Christian hands. Reginald of Sidon was in charge of Tyre and was in the process of negotiating its surrender with Saladin, but the arrival of Conrad and his soldiers prevented it. Reginald left the city to refortify his castle at Belfort, and Conrad became the leader of the army. He immediately began to repair the defenses of the city, and he cut a deep trench across the mole that joined the city to the shore, to prevent the enemy from approaching the city. The Muslim army arrived on November 12, and started the siege. The rest of the army arrived 13 days later.

The siege

The fight was hard. Saladin's army had seventeen siege engines that constantly attacked the city's walls, while the ships of the crusaders, filled with archers, crossbowmen and stone throwing engines, harassed the attacking army.

All of Saladin's attacks failed, and the siege dragged on, with occasional sallies by the defenders, led by a Spanish knight named Sancho Martin, better known as the "green knight" due to the colour of his arms. His bravery and skill were said to cause admiration in both the Christian and Muslim armies, and particularly in Saladin. It was said that Saladin offered him many riches if he would convert to Islam and fight in his army. Nevertheless, he refused and kept leading the Christian attacks against the Muslim army.

It became clear to Saladin that only by winning at sea could he take the city. He summoned a fleet of 10 galleys commanded by a North African sailor named Abd al-Salam al-Maghribi. The Muslim fleet had initial success in forcing the Christian galleys into the harbour, but through the night of 29–30 December, a Christian fleet of 17 galleys attacked 5 of the Muslim galleys, inflicting a decisive defeat and capturing them. Muslim chroniclers claim that Al-Faris Bedran's incompetency led to the defeat. The remaining galleys were ordered to retire, given their low numbers. After this naval setback, Saladin's forces made a final attempt to take the city, but they were defeated again, suffering heavy losses.

After these events, Saladin summoned his emirs for a conference, to discuss if they should retire or keep trying. The opinions were divided, but Saladin, seeing the state of his troops, decided to retire to Acre. The siege ended on January 1, 1188.

Aftermath
After the victory, Conrad's prestige received a huge boost. For Saladin, it constituted a turning point in his career. It proved the incapacity of his army to sustain long sieges. For the crusaders, it was a very important victory because Tyre became a rallying-point for the future Christian revival during the Third Crusade.  Had Tyre not held out, it is likely that the Third Crusade would have been much less successful.

Notes

References
 Helen Nicholson, David Nicolle (2005). God's Warriors: Knights Templar, Saracens and the Battle for Jerusalem
 George Payne Rainsford James (1854). History of the life of Richard Coeur-de-Lion, King of England, Vol. 2
 Jaroslav Folda (2005). Crusader art in the Holy Land: from the Third Crusade to the fall of Acre 1187–1291
 Stanley Lane-Poole (1985). Saladin and the Fall of the Kingdom of Jerusalem.

Tyre 1187
Tyre
Tyre
Tyre
1187 in Asia
History of Tyre, Lebanon
Tyre
1180s in the Kingdom of Jerusalem
1180s in the Ayyubid Sultanate